The 2014 Hobart International was a tennis tournament played on outdoor hard courts. It was the 21st edition of the event and part of the WTA International tournaments of the 2014 WTA Tour. It took place at the Hobart International Tennis Centre in Hobart, Australia from 5 through 11 January 2014.

Points and prize money

Point distribution

Prize money

1 Qualifiers prize money is also the Round of 32 prize money
* per team

Singles main-draw entrants

Seeds

1 Rankings as of 30 December 2013.

Other entrants
The following players received wildcards into the singles main draw:
  Casey Dellacqua
  Olivia Rogowska
  Storm Sanders

The following players received entry from the qualifying draw:
  Madison Brengle
  Estrella Cabeza Candela
  Garbiñe Muguruza 
  Alison Van Uytvanck

The following players received entry as lucky loser:
  An-Sophie Mestach
  Sílvia Soler Espinosa

Withdrawals
Before the tournament
  Flavia Pennetta (wrist injury) → replaced by  An-Sophie Mestach
  Stefanie Vögele → replaced by  Annika Beck
  Venus Williams (fatigue) → replaced by  Sílvia Soler Espinosa

Retirements
  Laura Robson (wrist injury)
  Elena Vesnina (left hip injury)
  Yanina Wickmayer (viral illness)

Doubles main-draw entrants

Seeds

1 Rankings as of 30 December 2013.

Other entrants
The following pair received wildcards into the doubles main draw:
  Kimberly Birrell /  Olivia Tjandramulia
  Olivia Rogowska /  Storm Sanders

Champions

Singles

   Garbiñe Muguruza def.  Klára Zakopalová, 6–4, 6–0

Doubles

  Monica Niculescu /  Klára Zakopalová def.  Lisa Raymond /  Zhang Shuai, 6–2, 6–7(5–7), [10–8]

References
Official website

 
Hobart International
Hobart International
Hobart International